The Ramat Gan bus bombing was a Hamas suicide attack on a crowded No. 20 commuter bus in Ramat Gan, Israel on July 24, 1995, near the Israel Diamond Exchange.  Six Israelis were killed and 33 were wounded. The bomb contained 33 pounds of TNT packed into a metal pipe.

The perpetrators
Just after 9:00 A.M., a call came in to the Associated Press office in East Jerusalem claiming responsibility for the attack. The caller boasted that a youth from Hamas from the Yahya Ayyash group from the West Bank carried out the attack"

See also
Palestinian political violence

References

External links
 Bus attack may speed up peace talks with Palestinians
 Remarks by Prime Minister Rabin on Israel Radio and Television on Ramat Gan attack, 24 July 1995.

Suicide bombings in 1995
Mass murder in 1995
Hamas suicide bombings of buses
Terrorist incidents in Israel in 1995
Islamic terrorist incidents in 1995
Islamic terrorism in Israel
20th-century mass murder in Israel
July 1995 crimes
July 1995 events in Asia
1995 murders in Israel